The Easthampton Public Schools district is the sole Public School District serving the city of Easthampton, Massachusetts. Administrated by superintendent Allison LeClair, the district serves grades PK12 across 5 schools, including Easthampton High School. The district is governed by a seven-person, elected school committee, inclusive of the mayor who serves as a voting member.

Demographics 
Per Massachusetts Department of Elementary and Secondary Education annual statistics for the 2020–2021 academic year, the Easthampton Public Schools district accommodates 1,443 pupils from grades PK-12, with an additional 2 Special education students beyond the 12th grade, totaling 1,445 overall.

Sources 

Schools in Hampshire County, Massachusetts
School districts in Massachusetts
Education in Hampshire County, Massachusetts